The 1990 Volvo International was a men's tennis tournament played on outdoor hard courts in New Haven, Connecticut in the United States and was part of the Championship Series of the 1990 ATP Tour. It was the 18th edition of the tournament and ran from August 13 through August 20, 1990. Derrick Rostagno won the singles title.

Finals

Singles

 Derrick Rostagno defeated  Todd Woodbridge 6–3, 6–3
 It was Rostagno's only title of the year and the 1st of his career.

Doubles

 Jeff Brown /  Scott Melville defeated  Goran Ivanišević /  Petr Korda 2–6, 7–5, 6–0
 It was Brown's only title of the year and the 1st of his career. It was Melville's only title of the year and the 1st of his career.

External links
 ITF tournament edition details

 
Volvo International
Volvo International
Volvo International